Potassium channel subfamily K member 16 is a protein that in humans is encoded by the KCNK16 gene.  The protein encoded by this gene, K2P16.1, is a potassium channel containing two pore-forming P domains.

See also
 Tandem pore domain potassium channel

References

Further reading

External links 
 

Ion channels